New North Zone is an economic administrative zone in north Chongqing, China. It was established in 2002 to include Chongqing Economic and Technological Development Zone, Chongqing High-Tech Industrial Development Zone and Chongqing Export Processing Trade Zone.

Chongqing Economic and Technological Development Zone was established in 1993. It covers an area of 9.6 square kilometres. The pillar industries in the zone include information and electronics, bio-pharmaceuticals, automobiles and motorcycles, refined chemicals and new materials, green food, and garments. Many international enterprises set up their factories in the zone.

See also

 National Economic and Technological Development Zones

References

External links
 New North Zone, Chongqing

1993 establishments in China
2002 establishments in China
Economy of Chongqing
Geography of Chongqing
Special Economic Zones of China